("I love to read" in French) is a French literary magazine aimed to children aged 7–10. Published by Bayard Presse since 1977, it is easily identifiable by its red cover and its mascot, a blue colored pencil named "" (a play-on-words meaning both "looking well" and "good pencil lead").

Each issue contains:
 An illustrated novel;
 Some pages of games and puzzles;
 Comics (originally Tom-Tom and Nana).

The magazine has more than 2 million readers each month and is one of the best-selling titles in its category.

An English language edition is published with the title Adventure Box since 1996.

References

External links 
  
 Adventure Box

1977 establishments in France
Children's magazines published in France
French-language magazines
Literary magazines published in France
Monthly magazines published in France
Magazines established in 1977